Cesare Borgia (13 September 1475 – 12 March 1507) was an Italian ex-cardinal and condottiero (mercenary leader) of Aragonese (Spanish) origin, whose fight for power was a major inspiration for The Prince by Niccolò Machiavelli. He was an illegitimate son of Pope Alexander VI and member of the Spanish-Aragonese House of Borgia.

He served as a condottiero for King Louis XII of France around 1500, and occupied Milan and Naples during the Italian Wars. At the same time he carved out a state for himself in Central Italy, but after his father's death he was unable to retain power for long. According to Machiavelli, this was not due to a lack of foresight, but his error in creating a new pope.

Early life

Like many aspects of Cesare Borgia's life, the date of his birth is a subject of dispute. He was born in Subiaco.
in either 1475 or 1476—the illegitimate son of Cardinal Roderic Llançol i de Borja, usually known as "Rodrigo Borgia", later Pope Alexander VI, and his Italian mistress Vannozza dei Cattanei, about whom information is sparse. The Borgia family originally came from the Kingdom of Valencia, and rose to prominence during the mid-15th century; Cesare's great-uncle Alphonso Borgia (1378–1458), bishop of Valencia, was elected Pope Callixtus III in 1455. Cesare's father, Pope Alexander VI, was the first pope who openly recognized his children born out of wedlock.

Stefano Infessura writes that Cardinal Borgia falsely claimed Cesare to be the legitimate son of another man—Domenico d'Arignano, the nominal husband of Vannozza dei Cattanei. More likely, Pope Sixtus IV granted Cesare a release from the necessity of proving his birth in a papal bull of 1 October 1480.

Career

Church office

Cesare was initially groomed for a career in the Church. Following school in Perugia and Pisa, Cesare studied law at the Studium Urbis (nowadays Sapienza University of Rome). He was made Bishop of Pamplona at the age of 15 and archbishop of Valencia at 17. In 1493, he had also been appointed bishop of both Castres and Elne. In 1494, he also received the title of abbot of the abbey of Saint-Michel-de-Cuxa. Along with his father's elevation to Pope, Cesare was made Cardinal at the age of 18.

Alexander VI staked the hopes of the Borgia family on Cesare's brother Giovanni, who was made captain general of the military forces of the papacy. Giovanni was assassinated in 1497 under mysterious circumstances. Several contemporaries suggested that Cesare might have been his killer, as Giovanni's disappearance could finally open to him a long-awaited military career and also solve the jealousy over Sancha of Aragon, wife of Cesare's younger brother, Gioffre, and mistress of both Cesare and Giovanni. Cesare's role in the act has never been clear. However, he had no definitive motive, as he was likely to be given a powerful secular position, whether or not his brother lived. It is possible that Giovanni was killed as a result of a sexual liaison.

On 17 August 1498, Cesare resigned the cardinalate, which he did in order to pursue a military career. On the same day, Louis XII of France named Cesare Duke of Valentinois. This title, along with his former position as Cardinal of Valencia, explains the nickname "Valentino". On 6 September 1499 he was released from all ecclesiastical duties and laicised from his diaconal orders (because he only was ordained deacon on 26 March 1494 and never received other major orders as priesthood and bishop consecration).

Military

Cesare's career was founded upon his father's ability to distribute patronage, along with his alliance with France (reinforced by his marriage with Charlotte d'Albret, sister of John III of Navarre), in the course of the Italian Wars. Louis XII invaded Italy in 1499; after Gian Giacomo Trivulzio had ousted its duke Ludovico Sforza, Cesare accompanied the king in his entrance into Milan.

At this point, Alexander decided to profit from the favourable situation and carve out for Cesare a state of his own in northern Italy. To this end, he declared that all his vicars in Romagna and Marche were deposed. Though in theory subject directly to the pope, these rulers had been practically independent or dependent on other states for generations. In the view of the citizens, these vicars were cruel and petty. When Cesare eventually took power, he was viewed by the citizens as a great improvement.

Cesare was appointed commander of the papal armies with a number of Italian mercenaries, supported by 300 cavalry and 4,000 Swiss infantry sent by the King of France. Alexander sent him to capture Imola and Forlì, ruled by Caterina Sforza (mother of the Medici condottiero Giovanni dalle Bande Nere). Despite being deprived of his French troops after the conquest of those two cities, Borgia returned to Rome to celebrate a triumph and to receive the title of Papal Gonfalonier from his father. In 1500 the creation of twelve new cardinals granted Alexander enough money for Cesare to hire the condottieri, Vitellozzo Vitelli, Gian Paolo Baglioni, Giulio and Paolo Orsini, and Oliverotto Euffreducci, who resumed his campaign in Romagna.

Giovanni Sforza, first husband of Cesare's sister Lucrezia, was soon ousted from Pesaro; Pandolfo Malatesta lost Rimini; Faenza surrendered, its young lord Astorre III Manfredi being later drowned in the Tiber by Cesare's order. In May 1501 the latter was created duke of Romagna. Hired by Florence, Cesare subsequently added the lordship of Piombino to his new lands.

While his condottieri took over the siege of Piombino which ended in 1502, Cesare commanded the French troops in the sieges of Naples and Capua, defended by Prospero and Fabrizio Colonna. On 24 June 1501 his troops stormed the latter, causing the collapse of Aragonese power in southern Italy.

In June 1502 he set out for Marche, where he was able to capture Urbino and Camerino by treason. He planned to conquer Bologna next. However, his condottieri, most notably Vitellozzo Vitelli and the Orsini brothers (Giulio, Paolo and Francesco), feared Cesare's cruelty and set up a plot against him. Guidobaldo da Montefeltro and Giovanni Maria da Varano returned to Urbino and Camerino, and Fossombrone revolted. The fact that his subjects had enjoyed his rule thus far meant that his opponents had to work much harder than they would have liked. He eventually recalled his loyal generals to Imola, where he waited for his opponents' loose alliance to collapse. Cesare called for a reconciliation, but imprisoned his condottieri in Senigallia, then called Sinigaglia, a feat described as a "wonderful deceiving" by historian Paolo Giovio, and had them strangled. In 1503 he conquered the Republic of San Marino.

Later years and death

Although he was an immensely capable general and statesman, Cesare had trouble maintaining his domain without continued Papal patronage. Niccolò Machiavelli cites Cesare's dependence on the good will of the Papacy, under the control of his father, as being the principal disadvantage of his rule. Machiavelli argued that, had Cesare been able to win the favour of the new Pope, he would have been a very successful ruler. The news of his father's death in 1503 arrived when Cesare was planning the conquest of Tuscany. While he was convalescing in Castel Sant'Angelo from an attack of malarial fever (likely contracted on the same occasion when Alexander contracted his fatal illness), his troops controlled the conclave.

The new pope, Pope Pius III, supported Cesare Borgia and reconfirmed him as Gonfaloniere, but after a brief pontificate of twenty-six days, he died. Borgia's deadly enemy, Giuliano Della Rovere, then succeeded by dexterous diplomacy in tricking the weakened Cesare Borgia into supporting him by offering him money and continued papal backing for Borgia policies in the Romagna; promises which he disregarded upon his election as Pope Julius II by the near-unanimous vote of the cardinals. Realizing his mistake by then, Cesare tried to correct the situation to his favour, but Pope Julius II made sure of its failure at every turn. Cesare was for example forced by Julius to give up San Marino, after occupying the republic for six months.

Cesare Borgia, who was facing the hostility of Ferdinand II of Aragon, was betrayed while in Naples by Gonzalo Fernández de Córdoba, a man he had considered his ally, and imprisoned there, while his lands were retaken by the Papacy. In 1504 he was transferred to Spain and imprisoned first in the Castle of Chinchilla de Montearagón in La Mancha, but after an attempted escape he was moved north to the Castle of La Mota, Medina del Campo, near Segovia. He did manage to escape from the Castle of La Mota with assistance, and after running across Santander, Durango and Gipuzkoa, he arrived in Pamplona on 3 December 1506, and was much welcomed by King John III of Navarre, who was missing an experienced military commander, ahead of the feared Castilian invasion.

Borgia recaptured Viana, Navarre, which had been in the hands of forces loyal to Louis de Beaumont, the count of Lerín and Ferdinand II of Aragon's conspiratorial ally in Navarre, but not the castle, which he then besieged. In the early morning of 11 March 1507, an enemy party of knights fled from the castle during a heavy storm. Outraged at the ineffectiveness of the siege, Borgia chased them, only to find himself on his own. The party of knights, discovering that he was alone, trapped him in an ambush, where he received a fatal injury from a spear. He was then stripped of all his luxurious garments, valuables, and a leather mask covering half his face (disfigured, possibly by syphilis, during his late years). Borgia was left lying naked, with just a red tile covering his genitals.

Remains
Borgia was originally buried in a marbled mausoleum King John III had ordered built at the altar of the Church of Santa María in Viana in Navarre in northern Spain, set on one of the stops on the Camino de Santiago. In the 16th century the Bishop of Mondoñedo, Antonio de Guevara, published from memory what he had seen written on the tomb when he had paid a visit to the church. This epitaph underwent several changes in wording and meter throughout the years and the version most commonly cited today is that published by the priest and historian Francisco de Alesón in the 18th century. It reads:

Borgia was an old enemy of Ferdinand of Aragon, and he was fighting the count who paved the way for Ferdinand's 1512 invasion against John III and Catherine of Navarre. While the circumstances are not well known, the tomb was destroyed sometime between 1523 and 1608, during which time Santa María was undergoing renovation and expansion. Tradition goes that a Bishop of Calahorra considered inappropriate to have the remains of "that degenerate" lying in the church, so the opportunity was taken to tear down the monument and expel Borgia's bones to where they were reburied under the street in front of the church to be trodden on by all who walked through the town.

Vicente Blasco Ibáñez, in A los pies de Venus, writes that the then Bishop of Santa María had Borgia expelled from the church because his own father had died after being imprisoned under Alexander VI. It was held for many years that the bones were lost, although in fact local tradition continued to mark their place quite accurately and folklore sprung up around Borgia's death and ghost. The bones were in fact dug up twice and reburied once by historians (both local and international—the first dig in 1886 involved the French historian Charles Yriarte, who also published works on the Borgias) seeking the resting place of the infamous Cesare Borgia. After Borgia was unearthed for the second time in 1945 his bones were taken for a rather lengthy forensic examination by Victoriano Juaristi, a surgeon by trade and Borgia aficionado, and the tests concurred with the preliminary ones carried out in the 19th century. There was evidence that the bones belonged to Borgia.

Cesare Borgia's remains then were sent to Viana's town hall, directly across from Santa María, where they remained until 1953. They were then reburied immediately outside of the Church of Santa María, no longer under the street and in direct danger of being stepped on. A memorial stone was placed over it which, translated into English, declared Borgia the Generalissimo of the papal as well as the Navarrese forces. A movement was made in the late 80s to have Borgia dug up once more and put back into Santa María, but this proposal was ultimately rejected by church officials due to recent ruling against the interment of anyone who did not hold the title of pope or cardinal.

Since Borgia had renounced the cardinalate it was decided that it would be inappropriate for his bones to be moved into the church. It was reported that Fernando Sebastián Aguilar, the Archbishop of Pamplona, would acquiesce after more than 50 years of petitions and Borgia would finally be moved back inside the church on 11 March 2007, the day before the 500th anniversary of his death, but an Archbishopric spokesman declared that the church doesn't authorize any such practice. The local church said that "we have nothing against the transfer of his remains. Whatever he may have done in life, he deserves to be forgiven now."

Evaluation
 Niccolò Machiavelli met the Duke on a diplomatic mission in his function as Secretary of the Florentine Chancellery. Machiavelli was at Borgia's court from 7 October 1502 through 18 January 1503. During this time he wrote regular dispatches to his superiors in Florence, many of which have survived and are published in Machiavelli's Collected Works. In The Prince, Machiavelli uses Borgia as an example to elucidate the dangers of acquiring a principality by virtue of another. Although Cesare Borgia's father gave him the power to set up, Cesare ruled the Romagna with skill and tact for the most part. However, when his father died, and a rival to the Borgia family entered the Papal seat, Cesare was overthrown in a matter of months.

Machiavelli attributes two episodes to Cesare Borgia: the method by which the Romagna was pacified, which Machiavelli describes in chapter VII of The Prince, and the assassination of his captains on New Year's Eve of 1502 in Senigallia.

Machiavelli's use of Borgia is subject to controversy. Some scholars see in Machiavelli's Borgia the precursor of state crimes in the 20th century. Others, including Macaulay and Lord Acton, have historicized Machiavelli's Borgia, explaining the admiration for such violence as an effect of the general criminality and corruption of the time.

Borgia and Leonardo
Cesare Borgia briefly employed Leonardo da Vinci as military architect and engineer between 1502 and 1503. Cesare provided Leonardo with an unlimited pass to inspect and direct all ongoing and planned construction in his domain. While in Romagna, Leonardo built the canal from Cesena to the Porto Cesenatico.

Before meeting Cesare, Leonardo had worked at the Milanese court of Ludovico Sforza for many years, until Louis XII of France drove Sforza out of Italy. After Cesare, Leonardo was unsuccessful in finding another patron in Italy. King Francis I of France was able to convince Leonardo to enter his service, and the last three years of Leonardo's life were spent working in France.

Personal life

On 10 May 1499, Cesare married Charlotte of Albret (1480 – 11 March 1514), a sister of King John III of Navarre. The arrangement was part of a plan by the Navarrese monarchs to ease tensions with the newly proclaimed French King Louis XII by offering a royal blood bride in his dealings with the Holy See. They were parents to a daughter, Louise Borgia (1500–1553).

Cesare was also father to at least 11 illegitimate children. Among them are Girolamo Borgia who married Isabella Contessa di Carpi and Camilla Lucrezia Borgia (the younger) who, after Cesare's death, was moved to Ferrara to the court of her aunt Lucrezia Borgia (the elder).

There are accounts recorded by Machiavelli during his time spent with Cesare Borgia that provide insight into the man. Machiavelli found that he could be at times secretive and taciturn, at other times loquacious and boastful. He alternated bursts of demonic activity, when he stayed up all night receiving and dispatching messengers, with moments of unaccountable sloth, when he remained in bed refusing to see anyone. He was quick to take offense and rather remote from his immediate entourage and yet very open with his subjects, loving to join in local sports and to cut a dashing figure. However, at other times, Machiavelli observed Cesare as having "inexhaustible" energy and an unrelenting genius in military matters, and also diplomatic affairs, and he would go days and nights on end without seemingly requiring sleep.

He is said to have possessed a high intelligence that was recognized early during his time at the University of Pisa, and his brilliance in being a military commander and battle tactician was respected by friend and foe alike.  Nearly all contemporary accounts of Cesare Borgia mention this intelligence, sometimes elaborated further by accounts made by allies, and other times, only briefly mentioned by those who most likely had a personal antipathy towards Cesare, but was still hinted at or briefly mentioned nonetheless.  With his personality, he was able to win the unwavering loyalty of his troops and also with his most trusted friend and "manservant", Micheletto Corella.

Character discussed in works of philosophy
 The Prince (1532) by Niccolò Machiavelli
 The Antichrist (1895) by Friedrich Nietzsche 
 Beyond Good and Evil (1886) by Friedrich Nietzsche
 Twilight of the Idols (1889) by Friedrich Nietzsche
 Minima Moralia (1951) by Theodor Adorno
 The Philosophy of the Encounter (2006) by Louis Althusser

Non-fiction literature
 The Life of Cesare Borgia (1912) by Rafael Sabatini
 Cesare Borgia: The Machiavellian Prince (1942) by Carlo Beuf
 A Triptych of Poisoners (1958) by Jean Plaidy
 Cesare Borgia (1976) by Sarah Bradford
 The Borgias (1981) by Sarah Bradford and John Prebble
 The Artist, The Philosopher and the Warrior (2009) by Paul Strathern
 The Borgias: The Hidden History (2013) by G. J. Meyer
 Cesare Borgia in a Nutshell (2016) by Samantha Morris

Fictional portrayals
Cesare is a character in Prince of Foxes, a 1947 historical fiction novel by Samuel Shellabarger. In the 1949 film adaptation of the story, he is portrayed by Orson Welles.
In the 1981 BBC TV series The Borgias, Cesare is portrayed by Oliver Cotton.
 Cesare appears as the main antagonist of the 2010 video game Assassin's Creed: Brotherhood. He is voiced by Andreas Apergis.
 In The Borgias, a 2011 American TV series, Cesare is portrayed by Francois Arnaud.
 In Borgia, a 2011 European TV series, Cesare is portrayed by Mark Ryder.
 The Hatsune Miku & KAITO song "Cantarella" is based on Cesare Borgia and his sister Lucrezia Borgia.
 The Cantarella manga by You Higuri is a dark fantasy historic fiction on Cesare's life with some supernatural elements.
 Cesare: Hakai no Sōzō-sha is a manga by Fuyumi Soryo that chronicles his life from the age of 15.

See also

Rocca di Borgia
Route of the Borgias

Notes

References

Sources

External links

Cesare Borgia, Encyclopedia Britannica

 
 Diario de los Borja (Borgia) 

1475 births
1507 deaths
Cesare
University of Perugia alumni
University of Pisa alumni
Dukes of Urbino
16th-century Italian cardinals
Cardinals created by Pope Alexander VI
Bishops of Elna
Princes of the Papal States
Archbishops of Valencia
Dukes of Valentinois
16th-century condottieri
Cardinal-nephews
Illegitimate children of Pope Alexander VI
15th-century Roman Catholic archbishops in the Kingdom of Aragon
Lords of Rimini
Captains General of the Church
Clergy from Rome
Military personnel from Rome
Lords of Pesaro
Lords of Faenza
15th-century Italian cardinals